Sistema Nacional de Televisión (National Television System), sometimes simply known as SNT, is a Paraguayan television network which reaches almost the entire population of Paraguay. SNT coverage almost all the Región Oriental, where approximately 97% of the population of Paraguay lives. Currently it has 11 repeaters. As of 1999, the channel is owned by Albavisión.

Programming

News 
 La Mañana de Cada Dia
 24 Horas
 Pulso Urbano

Sports 
 SNT Deportes

Slogans

References

External links 
  Official site

Television channels and stations established in 1965
Television stations in Paraguay
Spanish-language television stations